Hayes St Leger, 4th Viscount Doneraile (1 October 1818 – 26 August 1887) was an Anglo-Irish peer.

Doneraile was the son of Hayes St Leger, 3rd Viscount Doneraile and Lady Charlotte Esther Bernard. He married Mary Ann Grace Louisa Lenox-Conyngham, the daughter of George Lenox-Conyngham and Elizabeth Holmes, on 20 August 1851. Together they had two daughters and a son, although only his daughter Emily Ursula Clare St Leger survived to adulthood. He sat in the British House of Lords as an Irish representative peer between 1855 and 1887, having succeeded to his father's title in 1854. He held the office of Deputy Lieutenant and gained the rank of Honorary Colonel in the service of the 9th Battalion, King's Royal Rifle Corps.

Doneraile was one of the great huntsmen of his day and he kept a pet fox, which became rabid and bit its master. Lord Doneraile contracted rabies and died when he was smothered with pillows by the housemaids to spare him suffering and prevent him from spreading the disease to others.

References

1818 births
1887 deaths
Viscounts in the Peerage of Ireland
19th-century Anglo-Irish people
Irish representative peers
Hayes
Deaths from asphyxiation
Infectious disease deaths in the United Kingdom
Neurological disease deaths in the United Kingdom
Deaths from rabies
Lenox-Conyngham family